= Axle layout =

Axle layout may refer to:

- UIC classification of locomotive axle arrangements
- Wheel arrangement
